Pitlyal Loch also known as Round Loch is a small lochan in Sidlaw Hills in Angus.

Geography
The loch is a designated Site of Special Scientific Interest (SSSI).

See also
 List of lochs in Scotland

References

Freshwater lochs of Scotland
Lochs of Angus, Scotland
Tay catchment
Protected areas of Angus, Scotland
Sites of Special Scientific Interest in Scotland
Conservation in the United Kingdom
Special Areas of Conservation in Scotland
Birdwatching sites in Scotland